Punta Imperatore Lighthouse is an active lighthouse located atop an impressive overhanging promontory in the westernmost point of Ischia, Campania on the Tyrrhenian Sea. The lighthouse serves Naples as sighting approach.

Description
The lighthouse is completely automated and operated by the Marina Militare with the identification code number 2398 E.F.
The lighthouse for many years was managed by Lucia Capuano, widow of the lighthouse keeper who died in service on November 25, 1937, who succeed to get her husband's job and become a keeper herself.

See also
 List of lighthouses in Italy
 Ischia

References

External links

 Servizio Fari Marina Militare

Lighthouses in Italy